Astrothelium komposchii is a species of corticolous (bark-dwelling) lichen in the family Trypetheliaceae. Found in Venezuela, it was formally described as a new species in 2016 by Dutch lichenologist André Aptroot. The species epithet honours Komposch. The lichen has a green, discontinuous thallus comprising rows of small, flattened  (almost squamulose in appearance) with a hyaline (translucent) cortex. The presence of the lichen does not induce the formation of galls in the host plant. No lichen products were detected in the collected specimens using thin-layer chromatography. The main characteristics of the lichen distinguishing it from others in Astrothelium are the uncoloured hamathecium, and the dimensions of its ascospores (35–45 μm broad).

References

komposchii
Lichen species
Lichens described in 2016
Lichens of Venezuela
Taxa named by André Aptroot